Ruyaulcourt is a commune in the Pas-de-Calais department in the Hauts-de-France region of France.

Geography

Population

Places of interest
 The church of St.Pierre, rebuilt, along with most of the village, after World War I.
 The Commonwealth War Graves Commission cemetery.
 The Ruyaulcourt Tunnel is a notable feature of the Canal du Nord.

See also
Communes of the Pas-de-Calais department

References

External links

 CWGC military cemetery

Communes of Pas-de-Calais